In (automotive) vehicle dynamics, slip is the relative motion between a tire and the road surface it is moving on.  This slip can be generated either by the tire's rotational speed being greater or less than the free-rolling speed (usually described as percent slip), or by the tire's plane of rotation being at an angle to its direction of motion (referred to as slip angle).

In rail vehicle dynamics, this overall slip of the wheel relative to the rail is called creepage. It is distinguished from the local sliding velocity of surface particles of wheel and rail, which is called micro-slip.

Longitudinal slip
The longitudinal slip is generally given as a percentage of the difference between the surface speed of the wheel compared to the speed between axle and road surface, as:

 

A positive slip indicates that the wheels are spinning; negative slip indicates that they are skidding. Locked brakes, means that  and sliding without rotating.

Lateral slip

The lateral slip of a tire is the angle between the direction it is moving and the direction it is pointing. This can occur, for instance, in cornering, and is enabled by deformation in the tire carcass and tread. Despite the name, no actual sliding is necessary for small slip angles. Sliding may occur, starting at the rear of the contact patch, as slip angle increases.

The slip angle can be defined as:

References

See also 
Contact patch
Frictional contact mechanics
Aristotle's wheel paradox
 Explanation with animation of the elastic slip website tec-science.com

Tires
Motorcycle dynamics